Hydrozetidae is a family of oribatids in the order Oribatida. There is at least one genus, Hydrozetes, and at least 20 described species in Hydrozetidae.

References

Further reading

 
 
 
 

Acariformes
Acari families